Nahk may refer to:
 N-acetylhexosamine 1-kinase, an enzyme
 Konstantin Nahk